MIBE architecture (Motivated Independent BEhavior) is a behavior-based robot architecture developed at Artificial Intelligence and Robotics Lab of Politecnico di Milano by Fabio La Daga and Andrea Bonarini in 1998. MIBE architecture is based on the idea of animat and derived from subsumption architecture, formerly developed by Rodney Brooks and colleagues at MIT in 1986.

Description

MIBE architecture is based on the assumption that autonomy is grounded on motivation and arises from superimposition of synergetic activities in response to multiple drives. An autonomous agent is developed to achieve one or more goals (primary goals), but secondary goals also originate from environmental and functional constraints. MIBE architecture defines both primary and secondary goals as needs. A specific drive originates from each need. MIBE architecture generates and weights all these drives in an explicit motivational state. The higher the urgency to satisfy a specific need, the higher its weight in the motivational state and the higher the drive to perform a behavior that satisfies the given need.

Differences from subsumption architecture
MIBE architecture mainly departs from subsumption architecture due to the introduction of a top-level motivational structure which determines behavior priorities at run time. That is, there are not layers and static hierarchical dependencies between behavioral modules, but each behavior constantly competes with others for taking control of the agent through the top level motivational state from which specific drives originate (via predetermined or reinforcement-learned functions).

While subsumption architecture is built on a predetermined hierarchy of behavioral modules, MIBE architecture consists of a more complex structure, where several behaviors (that always compete for taking control of the robot via the motivational state) can activate and control dynamically an adaptive set of underlying modules, called abilities. Each behavior performs its task by activating and tuning the abilities it needs. Abilities supply the functional modules for performing specific activities and may activate each other in a hierarchical structure in the same way behaviors use abilities. Both behaviors and abilities are implemented by the same kind of functional modules, but a fundamental difference exists: behaviors are self-activating modules in response to a robot+environment state, whilst abilities are just functional blocks activated and controlled by behaviors for accomplishing their tasks (or by higher-level abilities that have been already activated by a behavior). Behaviors exist for satisfying specific needs, whilst abilities are not related to any need, because they are used by behaviors for accomplishing their tasks, but have no meaning alone.

The list of abilities needed by each module (behavior or ability) is represented by its activation tree; the complete set of activation trees can be represented by a system-wide acyclic activation graph.

Behaviors are activated on the basis of their specific drive pressure in the motivational state at run time: the most motivated behavior (i.e., the most urgent or convenient) is always activated. Nevertheless, less motivated behaviors could even be activated at the same time, with the constraint they cannot use any of the abilities already collected by a more motivated behavior which is already acting. The BCR subsystem (Behavior Conflict Resolver) ensures no conflicting behaviors (i.e., sharing one or more abilities in their activation trees) can be active at the same time.

The main advantage of MIBE architecture is its high modularity and molecularity: new abilities and behaviors can be added easily without changing the existing modular structure. Similarly, a behavior can be modified or removed with no functional effects on other modules. Drives can be added to or removed from the motivational structure or modified with no need to change the previous system structure, except rebalancing the drive-generation functions.

The main issue of MIBE architecture is the difficulty of modeling the optimal boundaries of the state-space by shaping the motivational structure (i.e.: tuning the drive-generation functions or their learning algorithms) so that the autonomous agent performs the best behavior for each robot+environment state (however the same difficulty also concerns the development of autonomous agents based on subsumption architecture, although the static hierarchical dependencies between behavioral modules make them a bit easier to set up).

See also 
 Agent architecture
 Behavior-based robotics
 Cognitive architecture
 Emergent behavior
 Hierarchical control system
 Robotic paradigms
 Scruffies
 Situated

References

 F. La Daga, A. Bonarini (1998), "Behavioral control architecture with motivational approach for autonomous agents", Politecnico di Milano, Dipartimento di Elettronica e Informazione (DEI).
 M. Colombetti, M. Dorigo (1998), "Robot Shaping: An experiment in behavior engineering", Intelligent Robotics and Autonomous Agents series, MIT Press
 D. McFarland, T. Bosser (1993), "Intelligent behavior in animals and robots", MIT Press/Bradford books
Software architecture
Cognitive architecture
Robot architectures